Leonard N. "Butch" Gilliland  (born February 25, 1958) is a former NASCAR Winston Cup Series and Craftsman Truck Series driver from California. He was the 1997 Winston West Series champion and based on the west coast. All of his 10 Cup starts came at either Sears Point Raceway or Phoenix International Raceway, most of them as West competitors in Cup/West combination races, and all 12 of his Truck Series starts came at various west coast tracks. He has one NASCAR top-ten, which he recorded in a Truck Series race at Saugus Speedway in Santa Clarita, California in 1995. He retired from competitive racing in 2002.

He is the father of former Cup Series driver David Gilliland and the grandfather of NASCAR Cup Series driver Todd Gilliland.

Motorsports career results

NASCAR
(key) (Bold – Pole position awarded by qualifying time. Italics – Pole position earned by points standings or practice time. * – Most laps led.)

Winston Cup Series

Craftsman Truck Series

Winston West Series

ARCA Hooters SuperCar Series
(key) (Bold – Pole position awarded by qualifying time. Italics – Pole position earned by points standings or practice time. * – Most laps led.)

References

External links
 

Living people
1958 births
Sportspeople from Anaheim, California
Racing drivers from California
NASCAR drivers
ARCA Menards Series drivers